The Center for Policing Terrorism (CPT) is a national-security think tank formed after 9/11 in New York City.

Founding personalities

The Center's founders included former National Security Council Staffer RP Eddy and former White House Counter-Terrorism chief Richard A. Clarke.  Policy analyst Mark Riebling served as the Center's Research Director.  The Center reportedly developed a network of security experts who advised the NYPD, LAPD, and other domestic law-enforcement agencies.

National Counter Terrorism Academy

In 2008, the Center partnered with LAPD Chief William Bratton to create and administer the National Counter Terrorism Academy, offering local law-enforcement officers a standardized counter-terrorism curriculum.

Intelligence-led policing
The Center has advanced a theory of intelligence-led policing.  The doctrine fuses Israeli counter-terrorist tactics with the Fixing Broken Windows theories advanced by criminologist George L. Kelling and social scientist James Q. Wilson.

Intelligence support to NYPD

The Center reportedly provided analytical support to NYPD Deputy Commissioner of Intelligence David Cohen (intelligence), a former Deputy Director for Operations (DDO) in the U.S. Central Intelligence Agency. Describing the Center's work in his 2008 book, Crush the Cell, NYPD Deputy Commissioner for Counter Terrorism Michael A. Sheehan wrote that the Center "provided a team of intelligence analysts that supported our work with timely and accurate reports on fast-breaking issues."

References

External links
Richard A. Clarke, Against All Enemies, 
Mark Riebling, "The New Paradigm: Merging Law Enforcement and Intelligence Strategies." Center for Policing Terrorism, January 2006.
R.P. Eddy, "Be Prepared for Terrorism: How to Survive a Suicide Bombing."  Center for Policing Terrorism, 2002.
R.P. Eddy, "In The End All Terrorism Is Local," The Times, July 8, 2005.

Law enforcement in the United States
Counterterrorism theorists
Counterterrorist organizations